Euryops mucosus is a species of flowering plant in the family Asteraceae. It is found only in Namibia. Its natural habitat is subtropical or tropical dry shrubland. It is threatened by habitat loss.

References

mucosus
Flora of Namibia
Near threatened plants
Taxonomy articles created by Polbot